Mount Chincogan is located northwest of Mullumbimby, New South Wales, Australia and west of Ocean Shores. It is part of a large shield volcano Mount Warning which erupted millions of years ago.

Chincogan